Bob Crampton is a British former journalist and TV presenter.

Early life and career
Crampton was born in South Africa. His father was the country's first radio DJ to introduce piano music. At the age of 11, Crampton wanted to become a rugby player. He was educated at Sutton High School in Plymouth. After leaving Sutton High School, he was employed by a small weekly newspaper in North Devon for a four-year apprenticeship as a reporter. In 1983, Crampton moved to ITV Wales & West and became a news presenter and reporter. In 2008 he was appointed the weather presenter for The West Tonight.

On 16 February 2009 the ITV News West Country launched, following the merger of The West Tonight with Westcountry Live, Crampton was retained alongside Alex Beresford. After 41 years at ITV, he retired on 29 June 2018.

References

External links
Official Twitter

Living people
English people of South African descent
English meteorologists
ITV people
Year of birth missing (living people)